Micheli is an Italian surname. Notable people with the surname include:

 Khatlyn Micheli, Italian-American Mineral Policy Specialist
 Amanda Micheli, American filmmaker
 Blessed Clotilde Micheli (1849-1911), Italian Roman Catholic professed religious 
 Carlo Micheli (born 1946), Italian chess master
 Dante Micheli (1939–2012), Italian footballer
 Elena Micheli (born 1999), Italian modern pentathlete
 Enrico Luigi Micheli (1938–2011), Italian politician and writer
 Fiorenza "Fio" Micheli, Italian-American marine ecologist and conservation biologist
 Franco Micheli, Italian sports shooter
 Giuseppe Micheli (1888–?), Italian modern pentathlete
 Giuseppe Micheli (1874–1948), Italian notary and politician
 Guglielmo Micheli (1866-1926), Italian painter
 Isabella Micheli (1962), Italian former ice dancer
 Ivo Barnabò Micheli (born 1942), Italian film director and screenwriter
 Jacques-Barthélemy Micheli du Crest (1690–1766), Genovese politician, physicist and cartographer
 Laura Micheli (born 1931), Italian gymnast
 Laurent Micheli (born 1982), Belgian film and stage director, writer and actor
 Lucia Micheli (born 1969) - Italian sprint canoer
 Marc Micheli (1844–1902), Italian botanist, abbreviated as "Micheli"
 Maurizio Micheli (born 1947), Italian actor, voice actor, author and playwright
 Ornella Micheli (sometimes credited as Donna Christie or Ornella Micheli Donati), Italian film editor
 Pier Antonio Micheli (1679–1737), Italian botanist, abbreviated as "P.Micheli." Considered to be the founder of scientific mycology.
 Rodolfo Micheli (born 1930), former Argentine football striker 
 Ron Micheli (born 1948), former director of the Wyoming Department of Agriculture (1977-1992)
 Zanetto Micheli (c. 1489–after 1560), Italian, the first representative of the oldest known family of string instrument makers

See also
 Michelis

Italian-language surnames
Patronymic surnames
Surnames from given names